Waded Cruzado (born January 16, 1960) is a Puerto Rican professor of Spanish language and Spanish literature. She served as Interim President of New Mexico State University from 2008 to 2009, and since 2010 has served as the 12th President of Montana State University in Bozeman, Montana.

Early life
Waded Cruzado was born in 1960 in Mayaguez, Puerto Rico, to parents Morgan and Daisy. Her father gave her the unusual name of "Waded", an Arabic word meaning "peace". The oldest of four children, she had a brother and two sisters. She was raised in Mayaguez by her stepfather, Roberto, and her mother. The household also included two aunts and her maternal grandmother, Julia. Her grandparents were farmers, but her stepfather worked for a coffee company as a trader selling ground and packaged coffee and her mother was a homemaker.

She was taught to read at the age of three by her maternal grandmother. She would assist with getting the family's meal of rice and beans ready, and then spend the morning at a table with a primer. As a little girl, she often pretended to be a teacher to her dolls and stuffed animals, using a small blackboard and desk. She points to this early play-time as the root of her desire to be an educator.

When she turned five years old, Cruzado began helping her grandfather on his coffee farm, spreading beans out to dry. She also began assisting her stepfather in the coffee mill where he was a manager, stacking bags of pre-ground coffee. She often played in the mill, her clothes smelling of coffee afterward.

Education
When she was 10 years old, Cruzado's parents enrolled her in an all-girl parochial school in Mayaguez. After school, she returned home in her school uniform and played in the coffee mill (her clothes still smelling of fresh coffee at school the next day). She found school boring compared to her grandmother's lessons, and frequently got into trouble. As punishment, she was forced to read novels aloud to a blind nun. The experience taught her a love of literature which influenced her choice of major in college. Her parents wanted her to go to college, and her teachers expected everyone in the school to attend a university.

Cruzado was the first person in her family to attend college. She enrolled at the University of Puerto Rico at Mayagüez, the only land-grant university in Puerto Rico. Studying there had long been her dream. She graduated in 1982 magna cum laude with a bachelor's degree in comparative literature.

She immediately enrolled at the University of Texas at Arlington. She was the first person in her family to leave Puerto Rico and move to the mainland United States. She earned her master's degree in Spanish language and literature in 1984. She worked as a graduate teaching assistant in the school's Department of Foreign Languages and Linguistics from 1983 to 1986, and was appointed an Instructor there (working during the fall semester of 1986).

Cruzado next entered the doctoral program in the humanities from the University of Texas at Arlington. She received her Ph.D. in the humanities in 1990. While earning her doctorate, Cruzado was appointed an instructor in Spanish language at the Pontifical Catholic University of Puerto Rico in 1989. She left the Pontifical University in 1990.

Academic career
Cruzado was appointed assistant professor in the Department of Humanities at the University of Puerto Rico at Mayagüez (UPRM) in 1990. She was promoted to associate professor in 1994, and full professor in 1999. Former students later described her as a good teacher, and one called her "charming, witty, outgoing and eloquent."

In 1993, just prior to her promotion to associate professor, Cruzado was named assistant dean for student affairs in the UPRM College of Arts and Sciences, a position she held until 1995. In 1997, she was elected and served a single term as the faculty representative on the UPRM Administrative Board. A year later, Cruzado was appointed the associate dean for academic affairs in the UPRM College of Arts and Sciences, but after serving only a few months she was appointed as dean.

Cruzado left UPRM in 2003 to become dean of the College of Arts and Sciences at New Mexico State University (NMSU), where her fundraising secured donations to endow three professorships. Cruzado was a candidate for the position of provost at the University of Texas–Pan American in 2006 but withdrew her name from consideration after being named one of three finalists.

On September 1, 2007, Cruzado was named executive vice president and provost of NMSU. She was one of three finalists in a nationwide search, and her provost's salary was initially $220,000 a year. Cruzado attributed her rapid rise in university administration to the skills she learned as a professor. "In the administrative positions I've held, I still use the skills and lessons I learned when I was teaching. These are not two different, incompatible functions: they both stem from a desire to serve others." As provost, Cruzado emphasized better integration of teaching, research, and community service and worked to provide more access to a college education for disadvantaged and low-income individuals.

In 2008, NMSU President Michael Martin resigned to become chancellor of Louisiana State University. After interim President James McDonough resigned due to ill health, the NMSU Board of Regents appointed Cruzado the interim president on August 1, 2008. She was the first woman and the second Hispanic president of the school.

Cruzado declined to discuss her intentions about seeking the presidency publicly, though the NMSU Board of Regents was considering her for the job. The search for a permanent president for NMSU ceased in November 2008 after a pair of incidents. In the first, students held a rally to support Cruzado for president, and in the second, regent and presidential search committee member Laura Conniff held a brunch at her home in which Cruzado was lauded as the "first female president of NMSU". The other finalists for the presidential position withdrew their names from consideration, citing favoritism towards Cruzado. Regents Chairman Bob Gallagher asked Cruzado to step down as Interim President to quell the controversy, which she did. A new search committee was formed, and the presidential search process started from scratch.

Garrey Carruthers, former Governor of New Mexico, highly praised Cruzado's work as provost at NMSU, and said she was "loved by students, faculty, staff and the Legislature."

Presidency of Montana State University
Montana State University President Geoffrey Gamble announced his retirement on March 22, 2009. A 22-member search committee was established, and a nationwide search for applicants made. More than 60 individuals applied for the position. Cruzado was one of three finalists, the other two being Steven Angle, a chemist and provost at Wright State University, and Steven Leath, a plant scientist and vice president of research at the University of North Carolina.

Cruzado was offered the presidency of MSU on October 14, 2009. She accepted the following day. She became the 12th President of Montana State University, and her first day in office was January 4, 2010. Her appointment was not without some controversy. There was some criticism by members of the public and student body about the style of leadership she would bring to the campus, and some members of the public felt her salary was too high.

Although Cruzado took office on January 4, 2010, her official inauguration did not occur until September 10, 2010.

In May 2013, Cruzado's salary was reported to be $289,466 a year. With other compensation and benefits, her total remuneration was $335,173 a year. According to the Chronicle of Higher Education, her salary was ranked 167th out of 212 public college presidents surveyed.

Governance style

Cruzado adopted a highly personal style as president which impressed many. The Bozeman Daily Chronicle noted that this style included listening intently, touching a person on the elbow when conversing, and memorizing names. Both Jim Rimpau, MSU's vice president for planning, and Marvin Lansverk, a professor of English, call her charismatic. Lansverk and Jeff Jacobson, dean of the MSU College of Agriculture, have pointed out that she is very energetic. Cruzado also communicates frequently with the MSU campus about her views and objectives. She implemented a mass email, the "Monday Morning Memo", which is sent to all administration, faculty, and student email addresses at the beginning of each workweek.

Part of Cruzado's governing style is to seek out the views of others. In her first year in office, she held meetings across the state to solicit citizen views on the university. She also met one-on-one with many of the state's agricultural leaders. In September 2010 Cruzado began holding monthly luncheon meetings open to any who wished to attend, to solicit input on a variety of ideas. An example of this aspect of her governance style is her football stadium listening session. When she proposed spending several million dollars to expand the MSU football arena, she held a two-hour session with students to obtain their views and ensure it was what they wanted.

Cruzado has shown that, at times, she will disregard or overturn the decisions of other administrators. In spring 2010, she overturned a decision of the campus budget committee and delayed implementing new programs so that the university would not lay off employees in the event of legislative budget cuts. In April 2010, 60 students, faculty, and staff protested Interim Provost Joe Fedock's proposal to merge the department of microbiology with another department. Cruzado overturned his decision. She agreed to a plan to fill vacancies, hire a permanent department head, and reenergize the department rather than merge it. The plan had three years to work, or the department would be merged.

Cruzado also established several advisory groups to assist her in making decisions. In order to achieve more transparency in decision-making, Cruzado created five new advisory committees in 2010. These include the University Council, which is an overarching committee that touches on all things at MSU; a Budget Committee; a Planning Committee; a Deans' Committee; and a Research Council. With only a third of tenured faculty at MSU women and almost two-thirds of low-paid adjunct faculty women, Cruzado announced the creation of a 24-member President's Commission on the Status of University Women in September 2011 to determine causes and suggest solutions. In May 2012, she proposed creation of a seventh body, the Council on Leadership, Outreach and Engagement. This council was charged with promoting outreach activities by administrators, faculty, and students, and enhancing public awareness of the same.

The effectiveness of Cruzado's governance style has been highly lauded, but has also been questioned. On January 15, 2013, approximately 100 MSU faculty met in an off-campus meeting that the Bozeman Daily Chronicle called "highly unusual". The off-campus meeting issued a press release that identified five complaints: 1) Rapid growth of student enrollment "without a clear plan to provide the additional faculty, staff and facilities needed to maintain the quality of an MSU education."; 2) Worry about maintaining MSU's "standing as a top-tier public research institution," which drives economic development and attracts out-of-state students.; 3) Faculty concerns about a  "trend towards centralization of academic decisions."; 4) That faculty and others are not being listened to by senior administrators; and 5) Perceived "misalignment" between senior administrators' vision for MSU and that of faculty and academic leaders in departments and colleges. Some faculty expressed private concerns about micromanagement, failure to fill faculty vacancies, lack of follow-through after listening sessions, and too-rapid growth in enrollment that left faculty stressed. On January 17, 2013, Cruzado met face-to-face with three faculty members who facilitated the off-campus meeting, Sue Monahan, Robert Rydell, and Linda Young. This meeting also included Faculty Senate chair John Neumeier and chair-elect Robert Mokwa. Taking the concerns "very seriously" Cruzado issued a public, four-page letter on January 18, 2013. Cruzado reiterated that she was working with the Board of Regents to find funding to keep up with MSU's student growth and to match federal research grants, and that she strives to maintain open communication with administrators, faculty, and students. To enhance communication and problem-solving, Cruzado and Provost Martha Potvin plan to attend department meetings "to work together in identifying possible solutions." Cruzado also denounced as "preposterous" persistent rumors that she would leave Montana State to take a position at another university. Although the off-campus meeting represented about one-quarter of MSU's tenure-track faculty, it did not capture all opinions at Montana State University. Valerie Copie, a professor of biochemistry and chemistry emphasized that dissent is not necessarily widespread. She stated, "I support our president...Our administration is more open than ever."

In summer 2013, Cruzado expanded the membership of the University Council to enhance faculty representation. The chair and chair-elect of the Faculty Senate were both made full members of the council.

Leadership changes

Cruzado put her stamp on the university leadership almost immediately in the fall of 2010. The office of Provost had been created in 1992, and the portfolio of responsibilities added to that of the Vice President for Academic Affairs. Provost Dave Dooley resigned in 2009 after he was appointed president of the University of Rhode Island. In October 2010, Cruzado hired Martha Potvin, Dean of the College of Arts and Sciences at the University of North Dakota, to be the new provost. Picked from a pool of 73 applicants, she began her duties on January 1, 2011.

A second major change came in October 2010 when Cathy Conover, Vice President for Communications and Public Affairs (and MSU's chief state legislative lobbyist), retired. Conover was named chief lobbyist in 1997 by MSU President Michael P. Malone, and her position elevated to vice president by President Geoffrey Gamble in 2007. She was the first woman to permanently hold a vice presidency at the university. Conover told Cruzado in January 2010 that she intended to retire. After Conover left, Cruzado downgraded the position, retitling it Executive Director of University Communications. Lobbying duties were taken away from the position and given to Douglas L. Steele, Vice Provost and director of the MSU Extension Service. Steele resigned the Vice Provost position, and was promoted to a new position, Vice President for External Relations. He retained his position as director of the MSU Extension Service. Thomas Calcagni was hired in March 2011 as the new Executive Director of University Communications.

On April 7, 2011, Craig Roloff, who had served as MSU's Vice President for Finance and Administration for the past decade, abruptly left the university. No reason was given for his sudden departure. President Cruzado said his one-year contract was ending, his contract was not renewed, and that a "personnel matter" was involved. Roloff was long known for making university departments account precisely for all dollars spent, which created tension between the finance/accounting department and academic departments. Cruzado hired Terry Leist, director of budget and fiscal academic affairs in the provost's office, as Interim Vice President. Leist was made permanent in April 2012.

Cruzado had the rare chance to put her stamp on five of the university's colleges in 2011 and 2012. The dean of the College of Business and the dean of the College of Arts and Architecture both left MSU in 2011. In 2012, the dean of the College of Letters and Science stepped down to return to the faculty, while the dean of the library and the dean of the College of Education, Health and Human Development both retired. With so many vacancies, Cruzado hired a professional search firm to assist with recruitment, and she and Potvin held numerous meetings on campus to solicit input from faculty and students about the type of deans they wanted to see hired.

The first new dean was appointed in March 2012. Kregg Aytes, interim dean of the College of Business at Idaho State University, was hired on March 12. Cruzado chose Aytes from a field of 53 candidates, and he began his duties on July 1, 2012.

In April 2012, Cruzado hired Nancy Cornwell, Vice President for Academic Affairs at Stephens College, to be Dean of MSU's College of Arts and Architecture. She was hired from a pool of 28 applicants, and began her work on July 1, 2012. Kenning Arlitsch was hired by Cruzado in August 2012 to be the Dean of the Library at MSU. Arlitsch, Associate Dean for Information Technology Services at the University of Utah, was chosen from a pool of 18 candidates. He assumed his position on October 15, 2012.

In October 2012, Cruzado appointed two new deans at MSU. On October 1, Nicol Rae, a political scientist and Senior Associate Dean in the College of Arts and Sciences at Florida International University, was hired at the Dean of MSU's College of Letters and Science. A faculty backlash occurred when Provost Potvin suggested that a new dean would be in place by summer 2012. After a somewhat raucous campus meeting, Cruzado agreed to a longer search, but set a date of January 1, 2013 to have a new dean in place. Rae was awarded the position from a pool of 16 candidates, and he assumed his position on January 1, 2013. On October 9, Lynda Ransdell, professor of kinesiology at Boise State University, was named the new Dean of MSU's College of Education, Health and Human Development. Ransdell was awarded the position from a pool of 16 candidates, and assumed her duties on January 13, 2013.

Staff departures roiled MSU's external relations and communications efforts in 2012 and 2013. In August 2012, Douglas L. Steele resigned as Vice President for External Relations and Director of the MSU Extension Service in order to become head of the extension service at Texas A&M University. Tracy Ellig, the number two person in the communications division and director of MSU's news service, was named interim director of external relations (although it was unclear if this meant the position had lost its vice presidential status). Jill Martz, director of the Montana 4-H program, was named interim director of the MSU Extension Service in August 2012 and was still serving in that role a year later. Thomas Calcagni resigned as Executive Director of University Communications for personal reasons in April 2013, and Ellig was promoted to the position. Martz was quietly appointed interim vice president for external relations as well.

A sixth dean left MSU in spring 2013, when Dr. Carl Fox resigned as Dean of The Graduate School to become provost at Western Kentucky University. Dr. Ronald Larsen was named interim dean.

In August 2013, Cruzado had the opportunity to replace seventh dean at MSU. Jim Rimpau, long-time Vice President for Student Success, retired. Robert Marley, Dean of the College of Engineering, agreed to become the Interim Vice President for Student Success, overseeing the Office of Student Success.

Goals and strategic planning

One of Cruzado's earliest announced goals was to more closely integrate the units of the MSU System. The state legislature radically changed the way the state's two-year and four-year colleges and universities were governed in 1994. Eastern Montana College (located in Billings), Northern Montana College (located in Havre), and the Great Falls Vo-Tech Center (located in Great Falls) were transformed into two-year colleges and placed (along with Montana State University) in the Montana State University System. The president of Montana State University acted as chancellor for the system, while "deans" oversaw the two-year units. (Additional two-year units were later created in Billings and Bozeman.) Cruzado said she would place a much greater emphasis on integrating the two-year schools into Montana State University than her predecessor, Geoffrey Gamble, had. She called this the "one university" concept.

Another early goal was to take control of the college of technology on the Bozeman campus. Montana restructured its entire higher education system in 1994. In part, this turned the Great Falls Vocational-Technical Center (a two-year vocational-technical school) into a unit of Montana State University and changed the name to MSU College of Technology–Great Falls. (The state now began referring to all its vocational-technical schools as "colleges of technology".) Under a policy of the MSU System Board of Regents, vo-tech programs in Bozeman had to be under the control of one of the colleges of technology in the MSU System and not Montana State itself. In November 2009, MSU President Geoffrey Gamble sought permission from the regents to allow MSU to control the vo-tech programs on its campus, but the regents declined to authorize this. Cruzado began a similar push in April 2010, and said her goal was to create a full two-year community college at MSU. Cruzado was successful in the summer of 2010, and the MSU College of Technology–Great Falls programs, now known as Gallatin College Programs, moved onto the MSU campus in August. It initially offered programs in aviation, design drafting, interior design, and welding. Cruzado then won regents approval in May 2011 for the program to offer two-year certificates in bookkeeping and medical assistance. The program expanded again in March 2012, adding associate degree programs in art, general studies, and science and a certificate program in weatherization. The word "programs" was dropped from Gallatin College's name in May 2012.

In her inaugural address in September 2010, Cruzado emphasized reducing student attrition, embracing online education, enhancing interdisciplinary research by faculty, enhancing outreach to tribal colleges, hiring new faculty, significantly improving fund-raising, reducing the number of administrators, and making governance more inclusive and more transparent.

Cruzado announced a number of goals which she wished to achieve in 2011. Among these were development and implementation of a student retention program, continued expansion of research by faculty, more interdisciplinary work by faculty, expansion of online education, a program to improve faculty teaching skills, expansion of the outreach program to the seven tribal colleges in Montana, expansion of the university's "study abroad" program, a reduction in paperwork and bureaucratic procedure, adoption of a strategic fund-raising and capital campaign plan ("advancement"), and adoption of a campus strategic plan. Some of these goals were not implemented until the 2012–2013 school year. Among these were the Center for Faculty Excellence (funded by an October 2009 gift by former MSU president Geoffrey Gamble) and new advising and student retention software.

A year later, on September 5, 2012, MSU adopted a strategic plan at Cruzado's behest. The university's Planning Council had been working on the plan since mid-2010, and held several meetings to solicit feedback from administrators, faculty, students, and the public. The plan's top goals, which were to be achieved by 2019 (within seven years), included:
 Increasing MSU enrollment by 15 percent to 16,000 students, and doubling Gallatin College enrollment to 400 students.
 Improving the graduation rate from 51 percent in six years to 65 percent in six years, and reducing the attrition rate for freshman to 18 percent from 26 percent.
 Improving the number of faculty doing scientific research.
 Ensuring that all students and faculty engage in community service on a local, regional, national, or international level.
 Reducing greenhouse gas emissions and landfill waste.
 Increasing the number of graduate students; undergraduates from Montana; Native American, non-Native American minority, and international students.
 Increasing the number of online courses offered.
 Raising faculty, administrator, and staff pay.

Cruzado said she believed MSU had the capacity to absorb another 2,000 students, and pointed to construction on Jabs Hall and a 70-bed student dorm and the proposed renovation of Romney Gym. The new strategic plan was given the name "Mountains and Minds, Learners and Leaders".

In response to the strategic plan, an Academic Strategic Plan was drafted by Provost Martha Potvin and the deans of the university's colleges in late 2012. The academic plan put maintaining MSU's research funding and activity as its top goal. Other top goals included expanding enrollment by 15 percent by 2019 (to 16,000 students), enhancing research even further, and improving community service by faculty and staff. To achieve the research goal, the plan called for increasing the number of graduate students by 20 percent, increasing the number of doctoral students by 43 percent, and renovating lab space. Other goals in the plan included improving faculty salaries, improving financial aid to students, enhancing career guidance and counseling to graduating students, hiring more minority faculty (including Native Americans), renovating classrooms, reducing greenhouse gas emissions by 20 percent, and reducing landfill waste by 25 percent. But comments on the draft academic plan said MSU had no plan to pay for the additional faculty, classrooms, and laboratories that a greatly expanded student body would require. Potvin said the university would pay for them by "prioritizing". A member of the Board of Regents said the plan did not take into account initiatives by the regents or legislature, such as improving the time to graduation ( between five and six years).

Cruzado announced in summer 2013 that the 2013–2014 school year would be the "Year of Engaged Leadership", and she would emphasize community outreach and service. The university announced on September 10 that it made a major step toward reaching its enrollment goals. Total enrollment at MSU reached 15,294 for the fall 2013 semester.

Legislative relationships

Cruzado made a strongly positive first impression on the Republican-dominated Montana state legislature after her arrival in 2010.

However, in the 2011 legislative session the legislature refused to approve a $20 million bond issue to renovate the iconic and decaying Romney Gym on the Bozeman campus, a major goal of Cruzado's.

During the 2013 legislative session, the legislature imposed "performance-based funding" on the state's higher education system. Much of this funding requires that all state colleges and universities improve their graduation rates. It again declined to allow a $20 million bond issue to renovate Romney Gym. It did, however, vote to allow MSU to accept $20 million donation from alumnus Jake Jabs to fund the construction of Jabs Hall (which will house the College of Business). It also gave $19 million over two years for salary increases, which amounted to about 2.5 percent a year.

MSU also received legislative support to expand two medical professional programs. Cruzado pushed for and won approval to expand the Washington, Wyoming, Alaska, Montana, and Idaho (WWAMI) medical program for the first time in 38 years. The program allows MSU students to spend their first year of medical school at MSU and then enter the University of Washington School of Medicine. The legislature also supported the creation of a cooperative veterinary medicine program with Washington State University. Up to 10 MSU students may be accepted into the Washington State University College of Veterinary Medicine. They will spend their first year of study at MSU, and then transfer to Washington State.

In fall 2013, Cruzado sought approval from the Board of Regents to build a new 400-bed dormitory and elevate the university honors program into a college. These and other proposals would go before the state legislature in 2015.

Budget issues
Cruzado took over Montana State University when resources were already stretched thin. The university was reaccredited in 2009 by the Northwest Commission on Colleges and Universities. However the commission warned the university that it was trying to do too much with too little funding.

The biennial 2011 Montana state legislature cut $2.3 million from the budget for MSU. The budget problem was worsened by an impending decision by the Montana University System Board of Regents to spend more money on the University of Montana System than the Montana State University System. The MSU Budget Council held campus hearings on the issue, and provided three scenarios: A 3 to 5 percent increase in tuition (equal to $150 to $250 per year for in-state students), tapping reserve funds, or a combination of both. The reserve funds included the university's general reserve fund (which held $5.4 million), and as many as 30 other contingency funds, multi-year spending funds, or funds which ended the previous budget year with leftover money.

MSU implemented a 5 percent rise in student tuition for the 2012–2013 school year, which generated an extra $11 million revenue. Coupled with an extra $4 million in legislative spending and other revenues, the university's 2012–2013 school year budget grew by 9.1 percent to $168.6 million. Another $2.1 million remained unspent, as the university had not yet determined final enrollment figures by September 2012. About $1.2 million of these funds were spent on 16 projects, ranging from hiring student mental health counselors, creating a doctoral program in the College of Nursing, a master's degree in science and nature filmmaking, a sustainable food and bioenergy degree, an Undergraduate Scholars Program to encourage undergraduate research, new equipment and an expansion of the Taylor Planetarium at the Museum of the Rockies, and an architect to design a renovation of Romney Gym. The Budget Council received requests for funding, held campus-wide meetings to gain student input about them, prioritized them, and sent them to Cruzado for approval.

By 2013, however, unfunded needs were emerging. In an informal vote taken by faculty in May 2013, improving salaries and expanding classroom and lab space were the second and third highest priorities of faculty.

Capital campaigns and institutional advancement
Cruzado placed an early emphasis on "advancement"—raising private funds for operational and capital needs, one-time projects, financial aid, endowments, and other projects.

On January 1, 2012, at Cruzado's behest, the MSU Foundation and the MSU Alumni Association merged into a single organization. Michael Stevenson remained president and chief executive officer of the new MSU Alumni Foundation, while Jaynee Groseth retained her title as president as well. The combined organization had more than 13,000 alumni members and oversaw an endowment of $112.3 million. Cruzado authorized a rapid expansion in the new organization's staff to 51 from 39 employees. The two 50-member boards of directors were abolished, and a new, single, 18-member board of directors installed.  MSU alum and engineer Mike Ferris was appointed chair of the board of directors. The MSU Alumni Foundation began planning for a $100 million fundraising campaign, although it was forced to wait until the university's strategic plan was finished before embarking on the effort.

During Cruzado's presidency there have been several notable successes in the area of advancement. Alumnus Jake Jabs agreed to donate $3 million in December 2010 to add to the endowment of the Jake Jabs Center for Entrepreneurship for the New West, a unit of the MSU College of Business. It was his second major donation to the center. After alumni quietly raised $1 million to expand Bobcat Stadium, Cruzado went public in October 2010 with a campaign to raise an additional $4 million and agreed to match the fund-raising up to $4 million with university funds. The campaign was a rousing success, raising $5 million in private funds in less than a year. In 2011, alumnus David Kern and his wife, Judith Raines, donated $1 million to MSU to establish the Presidential Award for Emerging Scholars. The award targets students who may not be academically outstanding, but who exhibit great promise in leadership, academics, or research. It was the second major gift from Kern and Raines, who previously established an engineering scholarship in 2002. In October 2012, the university received one of its largest gifts ever when Jabs donated an additional $25 million to build a new business school building. Courting of Jabs had occurred for a decade. The donation was the largest in MSU history.

Turnover hit the MSU Alumni Foundation in May 2013 when Jaynee Groseth retired. Groseth joined the alumni association in 1992 as executive director after having served for a decade as director of admissions. She was appointed president of the alumni association in 2008.

Faculty hiring and pay
When Cruzado assumed the presidency of Montana State University, the Board of Regents expressed concern about the faculty. Faculty generally taught 23 percent more courses than their peers elsewhere in the nation (although classes were generally small, just 10 to 29 students), spending on students was 17.7 percent below the national average of $15,094 per student, just 72 percent of its freshmen returned for their sophomore year, and more than half its students failed to graduate. A troubling trend, the regents said, was MSU's over-reliance on adjunct faculty. in the 2009–2010 school year, MSU had 469 tenured or tenure-track faculty, but its 345 adjunct faculty accounted for 42 percent of all faculty.

One of Cruzado's earliest obstacles was contract negotiations with the Associated Faculty of MSU (AFMSU), a union affiliated with MEA-MFT. The tenured and tenure-track faculty voted 168 to 156 to form a union in 2009. Also forming a union with AFMSU were 200 adjunct professors at the university. Negotiations with AFMSU began in 2010, and resulted in a contract in late 2011. The contract provided for a 1 percent pay raise and a $500 non-pensionable bonus in the first year, and a 2 percent pay raise and similar bonus in the second. The pay increases were the same offered to administrators and staff.

MSU found some money for additional faculty raises in early 2012. Under the contract negotiated between the faculty union and the university, faculty were eligible for $1,000 lump sum merit pay raises and $1,000 lump-sum market rate salary increases. Market rates salary increases would be awarded to those faculty whose salaries were farthest below national job market averages. These payments were made in March 2012.

In the 2012–2013 school year, MSU implemented the faculty contracts' 2 percent across-the-board pay increase. Another $500,000 was spent in pay increases for faculty who were promoted, and merit pay salary increases. With enrollment expanding rapidly, Cruzado agreed to hire 18 tenure-track faculty and six adjunct faculty, and to fill 37 tenure-track and 17 adjunct positions.

MSU received a $3.4 million grant in September 2012 to improve the hiring, promotion, tenure, and leadership advancement of female professors. The university lost a 1974 gender discrimination lawsuit brought by female faculty members. When Cruzado began her tenure at MSU, the problems women faculty faced were still significant. Women faculty at MSU earned an average of $10,574 less (15 percent) than men, while nationally, the gap was between 7 and 12 percent. Male faculty outnumber female faculty by 2-to-1, MSU was below the national average of having women constitute 39 percent of faculty, and only 21 women were full professors (141 men held that rank). Women faculty also left the university at a rate of 14 percent per year, compared to a 6 percent rate for men. The new grant, which the university applied for at Cruzado's explicit instruction, was provided by the National Institutes of Health to assist MSU in boosting the low rate at which it hires women professors. In some MSU departments, women constituted less than 20 percent of all faculty, few women were associate or full professors, and almost none held leadership roles.

In December 2012 and January 2013, faculty hiring and salary issues became a controversial issue. The university's draft Academic Plan, issued that fall, drew a number of criticisms. Commenters said the university was not hiring enough experienced research faculty, spent too much money hiring assistant faculty (those just beginnings their careers), and was not paying faculty at all levels well enough. The academic plan did not address these issues, they said. A quarter of MSU's full-time faculty attended a meeting with Cruzado in January 2013 in which similar sentiments were expressed. Some faculty at the meeting also accused Cruzado of failing to fill faculty vacancies quickly enough.

The tenured/tenure-track faculty union proved controversial, however. A decertification petition, supported by a number of faculty, began circulating in 2012 as the union prepared for a second round of contract negotiations. The petition was successful, and in the decertification election which followed the tenured and tenure-track faculty voted 190 to 185 to dissolve the union. No decertification election was held for the adjunct union. Another union, the Graduate Employees Organization, formed to represent graduate students. The university agreed to recognize the graduate student union. Negotiations on their contract began in summer 2013.

In May 2013, an informal vote taken by faculty listed improving salaries the second highest concern, behind maintaining the school's status as a high-research university. But MSU salaries for full professors were ranked the lowest among all 50 states in July 2013. The state legislature appropriated $19 million for all administrators, faculty, and staff at the university, which amounted to about a 5 percent wage increase over two years. That was far less than the 8 percent wage increase other workers for the state of Montana received.

Hiring also continued to be an issue. On July 13, 2013, Cruzado defended the university's faculty hiring to the Bozeman Daily Chronicle. She said MSU had hired 39 tenure-track faculty, of which 31 were assistant professors, two associate professors, and six full professors. The university had only hired two associate professors and two full professors the previous year. She said the university would hire 45 tenure-track professors in the fall of 2013. This hires, she said, would help fill the 30 new tenure-track faculty positions created at MSU in the past two years. The university later retracted the claim about senior hires. Five of the eight associate and full professor hires were deans and two were department heads. The university admitted that all but one of the 32 other faculty hired in 2013 were assistant professors. An MSU spokesperson defended the practice, saying "Hiring at the assistant level helps us address enrollment growth".

In September 2013, Cruzado announced the university met its promise to hire new faculty. Forty-six full-time and part-time faculty joined the university, she said.

Research
When Cruzado arrived at Montana State, federal and private funding for research had been expanding rapidly for years. Between 2000 and 2009, federal research funding at MSU grew by 61 percent to $98.4 million. In 2006, 2007, 2008, and 2009, MSU was the only university in Idaho, Montana, North Dakota, South Dakota, and Wyoming to be classified by the Carnegie Foundation for the Advancement of Teaching as having "very high research activity" — putting Montana State among such elite institutions as Harvard University, Johns Hopkins University, Oregon State University, the University of Washington. and Yale University.

Funding from federal and private sources for research at MSU was $109.5 million in the 2009–2010 school year (Cruzado's first year on campus, reflecting grants awarded during her predecessor's tenure). It fell to $102.7 million in the 2010–2011 school year. This included a five-year, $3.85 million grant from the National Science Foundation to study fire and climate change in forests in Australia, New Zealand, and the United States. The grant was shared with the University of Colorado, the University of Idaho, and the United States Forest Service, and it was unclear how much money actually went to MSU. It also included a $1.6 million grant from the United States Department of Energy to study ways to store carbon dioxide underground, a grant the university had been working to obtain from Congress for several years. Another award was a four-year, $1.2 million grant from the Howard Hughes Medical Institute. The grant paid for integration of biomedical science into the undergraduate curriculum and paid for undergraduate biomedical research. It also paid for science and technology outreach to elementary and middle school Native Americans, and for scholarships to bring Native American students to MSU and expose them to science and technology courses. It was the third time MSU received the grant.

Cruzado said in January 2011 that she would continue to emphasize research at MSU, and research funding rose to a record $112.3 million in the 2011–2012 school year despite federal budget cuts. The 2011-2012 figure included a portion of funds from a $20 million, five-year National Science Foundation (NSF) grant to create an "Institute of the Environment" to study a wide range of environmental issues in Montana. The grant—shared by MSU, the University of Montana, the state's seven tribal colleges, the state's six two-year colleges, and its three community colleges—permitted the hiring of 12 tenure-track faculty, provided research support for graduate students, established a math and science mentoring program for Native American students, and created a high school-to-college transition assistance program for Native American students. Another $3.5 million in matching funds was received from the federal Experimental Program to Stimulate Competitive Research (EPSCoR) program. Mark Young, director of Montana's EPSCoR program, directly credited Cruzado for helping to win the NSF grant. It was unclear just how much of the money went to MSU, however. The total also included an eight-year, $65 million United States Department of Energy grant. The grant program will test whether greenhouse gases may be stored in underground rock formations. Negotiations for the grant began before Cruzado arrived at MSU, however. It was unclear just how much of the grant went to MSU. The grant was given to the Big Sky Carbon Sequestration Partnership, which in addition to Montana State University included three other universities, three federal energy laboratories, and at least three energy companies.

The research effort suffered several blows in 2013. In January 2013, a quarter of MSU's tenure-track faculty told Cruzado that they did not see the university putting money into hiring advanced faculty, improving research faculty salaries, improving laboratory space, or working to increase the number of graduate students—elements they said would go far to maintaining or improving the university's status as a high-activity research university. Research income for the 2012–2013 school year fell 16.6 percent to $93.7 million, which Cruzado said was due to federal budget cuts. On May 20, 2013, MSU's long-time Vice President for Research, Creativity and Technology Transfer, Thomas McCoy, left the university to take a similar position at the University of North Texas. Anne Camper, Associate Dean of the College of Engineering, was named interim vice president. That same month, an informal faculty poll showed that maintaining MSU's reputation as a high-activity research university was the highest priority of faculty. But tension between research faculty and non-research faculty was also very high. The number of graduate and doctoral students at the university also slipped. Graduate students (which included master's degree and doctoral degree students was 1,980 in 2010–2011, but just 1,888 in 2012–2013. The university strategic plan set a goal of 2,350 graduate students by 2019. The number of doctoral students was also inconsistent. There were 45 in 2010–2011, 56 in 2011–2012, but just 53 in 2013-2013. The strategic plan set a goal of 80 per year by 2019.

In July 2013, MSU announced that research funding fell $18.6 million to just $93.7 million for the 2012–2013 school year. President Cruzado initially said most of the drop was attributable to the expenditure of the one-time $14.9 million NIH grant that helped renovate Cooley Lab. She later said the drop was due to the federal budgetary sequester.

Campus concern over the university's research status grew throughout spring and summer 2013. Other universities were hiring high-performing MSU research faculty away, research faculty lacked confidence that Cruzado and other senior administrators understood what it took to keep research funding high, faculty pay was too low to retain researchers, vacancies were numerous, and few senior faculty were being hired. According to the Bozeman Daily Chronicle, "Some faculty members said privately that McCoy had given his life to MSU and they doubted he would have left if he hadn't felt frustrated." There was also fear that the Board of Regents was too focused on expanding the system's two-year colleges at the expense of MSU. Unnamed faculty cited by the Chronicle were highly critical of President Cruzado and Provost Potvin, noting that the first draft of the MSU strategic barely mentioned research.

Cruzado defended MSU's hiring and retention practices. In the 2012–2013 school year, she said, MSU paid $178,000 in retention salary bonuses and paid $1.35 million to provide equipment, materials, staff, and travel. Fourteen retention packages were offered to faculty; eight stayed, one left, and five were undecided. That compared, she said, to the 2008–2009 school year, in which only five faculty were offered retention packages totalling $521,000 (all five stayed). MSU also won state matching funds for all federal EPSCoR monies received, and now also offers bonuses to faculty who win research funding that adds at least 25 percent to their base salary. The university also increased the number of paid graduate assistants to 616 from 540 in the past two years, and added 12 more in the 2012–2013 school year.

By September 2013, the drop in research funding had created a $2.5 million budgetary shortfall in funds for overhead in the Office of Research. The university was forced to make up the difference from its general fund.

Construction

Although the Animal Bioscience Building was the first building constructed during Cruzado's tenure, it was one she had little to do with. In 1997, the Montana Land Board sued MSU, arguing that the university sold at below-market value or used for non-intended purposes land bequeathed to the university by Bozeman area farmers and ranchers. In 1999, the Land Board reached a settlement with MSU which, in part, required the university to set aside $3 million by 2005 to build a livestock research center. More than $13 million was earmarked by Congress over the next few years to build the structure. Additional fundraising also occurred, and more than 141 individuals gave more than $10,000 each to fund construction of the new center. The Wanke family of Rudyard, Montana, gave $2.7 million in honor of Harold Wanke (who always wanted to be a veterinarian but never got the chance).

Bobcat Stadium, MSU's football arena, underwent a major expansion due to Cruzado's boosterism. Expansion of the football stadium was long planned, and provided for architecturally during its 1998 renovation. Boosters had already raised $1 million by October 2010. When Cruzado learned of the fund-raising effort, she publicly endorsed it and challenged boosters to raise another $4 million with in the year. If they did, the university would float $4 million in bonds to match it (with funding for the bonds coming from football ticket sales). Boosters subsequently raised another $5 million by late December 2010.

In 2011, the university renovated Cooley Laboratory. The five-story building, constructed in 1960, had never been renovated. In 2009, before Cruzado arrived, MSU submitted a request for American Recovery and Reinvestment Act (the stimulus funds), and won a $14.9 million ARRA grant from the National Institutes of Health (NIH) to pay for the renovation. Another $1.2 million came from the Montana State Board of Investments InterCap in the form of a loan, $732,000 came from NIH to pay for lab equipment, and $71,000 came from other various MSU research grants. Reopened in September 2012, Cooley Lab was the first MSU building to win a LEED Gold designation as a "green building".

The university considered three sites in early 2012 for the new $18 million Jabs Hall: a Grant Street parking lot, a Hamilton Hall parking lot, and an open grassy are east of the Chemistry Research building. The open area was chosen as the site. Construction began in July 2013, and was expected to take two years to finish.

Aside from the $17 million Cooley Lab renovation and the $20 million Jabs Hall, another $49.6 million in construction projects were under way on the MSU campus . This included a multi-million project to replace roofs throughout the campus which were damaged during a severe 2010 hailstorm, a $3 million renovation of two residence halls (Hapner Hall and Langford Hall), construction of the new 70-bed North Hedges Suite 3 residential cottages, expansion of the Writing enter in Wilson Hall, and a project to improve energy efficiency in all dormitories, Brick Breeden Fieldhouse, the Marga Hosaeus Fitness Center, and the Strand Union Building.

Additional campus construction occurred in 2013. Married student housing cottages from the 1950s were torn down; the Brick Breeden Fieldhouse parking lot and part of the Bobcat Stadium parking lot were repaved; Linfield Hall, Roberts Hall, and Wilson Hall were renovated; and the Visual Communication Building received seismic bracing.

President Cruzado has made improvements to student facilities a priority. In 2011, she led the university to secure $15 million in bonding authority for upgrading student residence halls. During the summer of 2011, more than $3 million was spent on the Langford and Hapner residence hall rooms to make them more modern and appealing to students, and Miller Dining Hall—the largest on campus—had a $400,000 seating upgrade. President Cruzado made sure students were involved in all phases of the design process. Funds dedicated for current projects include $1.5 million to modernize classrooms, $1.5 million to improve accessibility and $9 million in energy conservation projects, which will upgrade all residence halls and other auxiliary facilities. In 2012, there will be a $6 million renovation of public spaces in Langford and Hapner residence halls during the summer, a $300,000 seating upgrade in Harrison Dining Hall. In addition, work is underway for a $7 million third Hedges Suite building, which will increase housing capacity beginning in the fall of 2013.

Community engagement
At Cruzado's initiative, Montana State University applied for and received a classification as a "community engaged" school. The classification was made by the Carnegie Foundation for the Advancement of Teaching and the New England Resource Center for Higher Education. The classification recognizes the university's commitment to volunteer service and spreading knowledge that benefits the public.

Student life
Cruzado also oversaw programs to improve student life.  The first was the Family Care Room, a place where mothers (faculty, staff, or students) can care of their infant children in privacy. The idea came from Cruzado's predecessor, Geoffrey Gamble. Cruzado oversaw the Family Care Room's opening, and dedicated a nearby parking space for those using it. On September 12, 2011, she dedicated a Veterans Center in the Strand Union Building. The center, which provides a lounge, resource library, and staff support, is designed to allow military veterans access resources specifically for them, obtain assistance in transitioning from military life to college life, and provides a quiet space for veterans with emotional issues.

In August 2010, Cruzado initiated a new tradition at MSU, the "Community Cat Walk". Led by a costumed Champ the Bobcat, the MSU Spirit of the West Marching Band, and football players carrying banners, about 50 MSU students and boosters walk through downtown Bozeman, Montana, handing out stickers and "bobcat earmuffs", signing autographs, and leading citizens in songs and cheers. The event began in 2010, and has been held every late August since as a way of building enthusiasm among local Bozeman residents for the upcoming school year and football schedule. Cruzado led the Community Cat Walk in 2010, 2011, 2012, and 2013.

Other roles
In November 2012, President Barack Obama appointed Cruzado to the Board for International Food and Agricultural Development (BIFAD), a seven-member council that advises the United States Agency for International Development on agriculture, nutrition, and rural development issues related to global food insecurity. Cruzado served on the board until 2020, and while she was a member, she chaired the selection committee for the BIFAD Award for Scientific Excellence in a Feed the Future Innovation Lab and engaged with higher education partners in West Africa. In 2015, Cruzado hosted the board at Montana State University and brought tribal college leaders into dialogue with BIFAD about their role in addressing poverty, nutrition, and food security.

In the aftermath of the Boston Marathon bombing, the University of Massachusetts Dartmouth appointed Cruzado chair of a three-person task force on the recruitment and support of international students, and emergency planning. Also serving on the task force were Susan Herbst, president of the University of Connecticut, and James Bueermann, president of the Police Foundation. The task force was asked to complete its work by August 15, 2013.

Memberships
Cruzado holds membership in a number of organizations related to her profession as a literary scholar and as a college administrator.  These include the American Comparative Literature Association, American Council of Education, Hispanic Association of Colleges and Universities, Modern Language Association, North Central Council of Latin Americanists, Society for the Advancement of Chicanos and Native Americans in Science, and the Southwest Council of Latin American Studies.

She is also a member of the Alpha Delta Kappa, Delta Sigma Theta, and Phi Kappa Phi national honor societies.

Honors
Cruzado was named the 2011 Michael P. Malone Educator of the Year by the Montana Ambassadors for demonstrating outstanding accomplishment, excellence and leadership in the field of education. She was also recognized as a Paul Harris Fellow by Rotary International and, in November 2012, the Association of Public and Land-grant Universities awarded her the Seaman A. Knapp Memorial Lectureship, in honor of the founder of the Cooperative Extension Service.

Published works
Dr. Cruzado has published a number of professional articles and reports. Among these are:
Cruzado, Waded. "Aire, Mar, Tierra: La Literature Infantile y la Education Ambiental." Atenea. 16:1-2 (1995).
Cruzado, Waded. "El Agua, la Fuente, el Espejo: Las Obsesiones Duplicantes de Carlos Fuentes." Sea Grant College Program. 1:1 (1993).
Cruzado, Waded. "La Huela Arabe en la Literature Medieval." Atenea. 11:1-2 (1992).
Cruzado, Waded. "Prologue, Roasario Ramos Perea." Te Canta el Coqui. Mayaguez: Gallo Galente, 1997.
Cruzado, Waded. "Taking Another Look at Bilingualism." Vista. 3:6 (1989).
Frehill, Lisa M.; Serrano, Elba; and Cruzado, Waded. Effective Strategies to Diversify STEM Faculty: A Toolkit.  Arlington, Va.: National Science Foundation, 2005.

Personal life
Cruzado was married to Rodolfo Mazo, but the marriage ended in divorce. The couple had two children, Gerald (born 1984) and Brenda (born 1987).

Her maternal grandmother Julia died of breast cancer at the age of 84. Her mother was diagnosed with the same disease at the age of 64.

References

Bibliography
Who's Who in the West. 41st ed. Chicago: Marquis Who's Who, 2013. 

1960 births
Presidents of Montana State University
Presidents of New Mexico State University
Puerto Rican academics
People from Mayagüez, Puerto Rico
Living people
University of Puerto Rico at Mayagüez people
University of Texas at Arlington alumni